Corydoras atropersonatus is a tropical freshwater fish belonging to the subfamily Corydoradinae of the family Callichthyidae. It originates in inland waters in South America, and is found in the upper Amazon River basin in Ecuador and Peru.

The fish will grow in length up to 1.8 in (4.5 cm).  It lives in a tropical climate in water with a pH of 6.0–8.0, a water hardness of 2.0–25 dGH, and a temperature range of 70–75 °F (21–24 °C).  It feeds on worms, benthic crustaceans, insects, and plant matter.

Corydoras atropersonatus is of commercial importance in the aquarium trade industry.

See also
List of freshwater aquarium fish species

References 

Corydoras
Taxa named by Stanley Howard Weitzman
Taxa named by Han Nijssen
Fish described in 1970